Frances Tiafoe was the defending champion but chose not to defend his title.

Cameron Norrie won the title after defeating Darian King 6–1, 6–3 in the final.

Seeds

Draw

Finals

Top half

Bottom half

References
Main Draw
Qualifying Draw

Stockton ATP Challenger - Singles